The Gwangalli Beach or Gwangan Beach is a beach in Busan, South Korea. It is located at Gwangan 2(i)-dong (formerly in Gwangan-ri), Suyeong-gu, Busan Metropolitan City, west of Haeundae Beach. It sits inside a cove spanned by the Gwangan Bridge and covers 82,000 square meters over a length of 1.4 km and a width of 25 to 110 metres, in a curved in a half-moon shape with fine sand. Adjacent are alleys with restaurants, coffee shops and nightclubs.
Because of its popularity, city officials are pushing for improving water quality around the beaches.

The beach is near the Busan Yachting Center used for the sailing events of the 1988 Summer Olympics.

For the 2018 film Black Panther, a car chase scene which required over 150 cars and 700 people was filmed in the Gwangalli Beach area.

Events
 Busan Marine Sports 2008: with beach volley ball, canoe and boating.
 2011 K-Pop Super Concert on 28 October 2011: emcee by Ha Ji-won and Kim Hyung Jun of SS501 and broadcast on SBS on 6 November.

See also

Gwangan Bridge

References

External links
  Gwangalli Beach (City of Busan) 

Beaches of South Korea
Suyeong District